Rogozov is a Russian male surname. Notable people with the surname include:

 Leonid Rogozov (1934–2000), Soviet general practitioner, notable for his autoappendectomy
 Yury Rogozov (born 1930), Russian rower

See also 
 Rogozin
 Rogozovka, a rural locality in Russia